The genus Hypericum contains a number of nothospecies, or hybrids created directly from crossing two accepted species to create an intermediate organism that shares properties of both. Many of these hybrid species are used as ornamental or decorative plants.

Nothospecies

References

+